Fahnenjunker (short Fhj or FJ,) is a military rank of the Bundeswehr and of some former German armed forces. In earlier German armed forces it was also the collective name for many officer aspirant ranks. It was established by the Presidential order of the Federal president on rank insignia and uniforms of soldiers.

Rank
Fahnenjunker is the entrance rank to an officer aspirant career. According to the salary class, it is equivalent to the Unteroffizier ohne Portepee ranks Unteroffizier of the army or air force, and Maat of the Deutsche Marine. It is also grouped as OR-5 in NATO, equivalent to Sergeant, Staff Sergeant in the US Armed forces.

In the army context, NCOs of this rank were formally addressed as Herr/ Frau Fahnenjunker also informally / short Fahnenjunker.

The sequence of ranks (top-down approach) in that particular group is as follows:
Unteroffizier ohne Portepee

OR-5a: Stabsunteroffizier / (Marine) Obermaat
OR-5b: Fahnenjunker / Seekadett
OR-5c: Unteroffizier / Maat

Rank insignia

Bundeswehr
An officer candidate's career is indicated by the enlisted rank with a thin silver cord on the shoulder strap in the army and the air force, and with the golden nautical star on the shoulder strap and sleeve in the Deutsche Marine.

The rank insignia of Fahnenjunker consists of shoulder straps, bordered by a golden braid that is open to the sleeve seam. Fahnenjunker of the air force wear an additional Air Force wing on the open end of the braid. The rank insignia on field and battle dress are in black colour.

Below the lowest officer designated rank of "Fahnenjunker," any military person who is assigned to be a career officer has to wear the two capital letters “OA” in addition to the particular rank, indicating the “Officer Aspirant” career.

Wehrmacht and Waffen-SS

See also
 Fanjunkare

References

Military ranks of Germany